Porumbești (Hungarian pronunciation: , meaning "Full of Blackthorns") is a commune situated in Satu Mare County, Romania. It is composed of two villages, Cidreag and Porumbești. These were part of Halmeu Commune until 2005, when they were split off. At the 2011 census, 81.4% of inhabitants were Hungarians, 16.8% Roma and 1.6% Romanians.

Its neighbors are Halmeu commune to the east, Turulung commune to the southeast, Micula commune to the southwest, and, on the Ukrainian side,  commune to the west and  commune to the north.

References

Communes in Satu Mare County